Throughout this article, the term "pound" and the £ symbol refer to the Pound sterling.

Capital gains tax in the United Kingdom is a tax levied on capital gains, the profit realised on the sale of a non-inventory asset by an individual or trust in the United Kingdom. The most common capital gains are realised from the sale of shares, bonds, precious metals, real estate, and property, so the tax principally targets business owners, investors and employee share scheme participants.
 
In the UK, gains made by companies fall under the scope of corporation tax rather than capital gains tax. In 2017–18, total capital gains tax receipts were £8.3 billion from 265,000 individuals and £0.6 billion from trusts, on total gains of £58.9 billion.

The current operation of the capital gains tax system is a recognised issue. The Conservative government consulted on the issue in 2020.

Beginnings

The capital gains tax (CGT) system was introduced by Labour Chancellor James Callaghan in 1965. Prior to this, capital gains were not taxed. Channon observed that one of the primary drivers to the introduction of CGT in the UK was the rapid growth in property values after World War II. This led to property developers deliberately leaving office blocks empty so that a rental income could not be established and greater capital gains made.

Exemptions and allowances
The main relief from capital gains tax in the UK is private residence relief, which brings an individual's principal residence out of scope of the tax, and personal possessions (the "chattels exemption") with a value of less than £6,000. There are also exemptions for holdings in ISAs or gilts. Certain other gains are allowed to be rolled over upon re-investment. Investments in some start up enterprises are also exempt from CGT. Allowable costs include the costs of sale of the asset, and capital losses realised in the same year may be used to reduce capital gains made on other assets.

In 1977, there was a general exemption for individuals from paying any tax if gains were less than £1,000 in any given tax year, which runs from 6 April to 5 April in the UK. Now known as the Annual Exempt Allowance, it rose steadily until 2020–21 when the allowance was £12,300 for individuals and £6,150 for trusts (the allowance for trusts has always been half of the threshold for individuals). Rishi Sunak's budget in March 2021 froze the allowance at this level until 2025–26, but subsequently it was announced that the allowance would be reduced to £6000 from 6 April 2023 and then to £3000 from 6 April 2024.

Labour Chancellor Gordon Brown replaced indexation allowance with taper relief in 1998 to reward risk-taking and promote enterprise. Taper relief was abolished in 2008. Indexation allowance generally reduced the tax payable on a gain by increasing the cost of the asset in line with inflation. Taper relief reduced the tax payable on assets that were owned for longer periods of time and its removal was necessitated, at least in part, because the UK government felt that private equity firms were making excessive profits by benefiting from overly generous taper relief on business assets. The changes were criticised by a number of groups including the Federation of Small Businesses, who claimed that the new rules would increase the CGT liability of small businesses and discourage entrepreneurship in the UK.

Rates
From 1965 to 1988, most gains incurred a 30% rate of capital gains tax. In 1988, Conservative Chancellor Nigel Lawson aligned rates with those for income tax (where the top rate was 40% at the time) and this regime continued until 2008, when Gordon Brown changed the rate to 18% for all taxpayers.

April 2008 also saw the introduction of Entrepreneurs' Relief, which applied a lower 10% rate to some gains made by business owners, directors and employees on disposals of business assets and company shares. The relief has always had a lifetime limit on qualifying gains by an individual, which was initially set at £1million.

In the March 2010 budget, Labour Chancellor Alistair Darling introduced a rate of 28% for individuals paying the higher or additional rate of income tax. The rate remained 10% under Entrepreneurs' Relief for those higher rate taxpayers, and the limit for the relief was raised to £2 million. It was raised to £5M three months later by the new Conservative/Liberal Democrat coalition government, who then doubled it to £10M in the March 2011 budget.

On 6 April 2016, new lower rates of 10% (for basic taxpayers) and 20% (for higher taxpayers) were introduced for non-property and non-carried interest disposals. Trustees or personal representatives for the estate of someone who has died pay 28% on residential properties and 
20% on other chargeable assets.

Entrepreneurs' Relief was renamed Business Asset Disposal Relief in the 2020 Budget, and the lifetime allowance under the relief was reduced from £10 million to £1 million.

Demographics
Between 2011 and 2019, very large gains have become more prevalent and make up a larger proportion of total net gains, while smaller gains are also on the rise albeit at a slower rate. A small proportion of taxpayers pay capital gains tax in consecutive years, and most gains are made on company shares. The majority of taxpayers are over the age of 55.

Example computation
This is an example computation involving an individual that pays tax at the higher rate and has made a sale on a non-residential asset.

Suggested reforms

2020 Government consultation
Chancellor Rishi Sunak requested a review of CGT by the Office of Tax Simplification in July 2020. Their first report was published in November of that year, followed by a second – on potential practical and administrative improvements – in May 2021.

Rates and income tax
The report made the recommendation to consider aligning capital gains tax rates with income tax rates, or addressing boundary issues between the two taxes.

Under the first option, there would need to be appropriate relief for indexation, adequate interaction with company tax positions and more flexibility for use of losses.

If there remained a disparity between the capital gains and income tax rates, the number of CGT rates should be reduced and there should be further consideration of the impact of an individual's other income. It should also be considered whether capital rewards for personal labour should be taxed at income tax rates, even if capital tax rates were to remain distinct.

Annual Exempt Allowance

In any case, it was concluded that consideration should be put towards reducing the Annual Exempt Amount from its current level of £12,300.

Interaction with inheritance tax
Under circumstances where an asset owner dies, they may benefit from a relief and exemption from inheritance tax, as well as benefiting from an uplift on the base cost of the capital gain. It was suggested that the base cost could remain at the cost to the person who died for capital gains purposes. This may require the rebasing of all assets perhaps to the year 2000.

Business reliefs
It was concluded that the government should consider replacing Business Asset Disposal Relief, formerly Entrepreneurs' Relief, with a relief more focused on retirement by increasing the minimum shareholding, increasing the holding period of assets and introducing a minimum age limit at a high level.

See also
Taxation in the United Kingdom

References 

Corporate taxation in the United Kingdom
Taxation in the United Kingdom